Kamui Dam  is a gravity dam located in Hokkaido Prefecture in Japan. The dam is used for irrigation. The catchment area of the dam is 37.1 km2. The dam impounds about 39  ha of land when full and can store 5300 thousand cubic meters of water. The construction of the dam was started on 1976 and completed in 1997.

References

Dams in Hokkaido